Stomatolina is a genus of sea snails, marine gastropod mollusks in the family Trochidae, the top snails.

Description
The depressed shell is rather flattened above and below. The aperture is quite oblique. The sculpture consists of numerous spirals, of which several have low carinae, more numerous intermediate riblets, and still more numerous interstitial spiral striae. These are sometimes decussated by growth lines.

Distribution
This maritime genus occurs in the Red Sea and off Indo-Malaysia, Oceania, Cook Islands, French Polynesia, Korea, the Philippines and Australia (Northern Territory, Queensland).

Species
Species within the genus Stomatolina include:
 Stomatolina angulata (A. Adams, 1850)
 Stomatolina arabica (A. Adams, 1854)
 Stomatolina calliostoma (A. Adams, 1850)
 Stomatolina danblumi Singer & Mienis, 1999
 Stomatolina irisata (Dufo, 1840)
 Stomatolina mariei (Crosse, 1871)
 Stomatolina rubra (Lamarck, 1822)
 Stomatolina rufescens (Gray, 1847)

The Indo-Pacific Molluscan Database also mentions the following species 
 Stomatolina orbiculata (A. Adams, 1850)

Synonyms
 Stomatolina scitula (H. Adams, 1872): synonym of Stomatella modesta H. Adams & A. Adams, 1864

Taxa inquirenda
 Stomatolina acuminata (A. Adams, 1850)
 Stomatolina compta (A. Adams, 1855)
 Stomatolina crenulata (Preston, 1908)
 Stomatolina exquisita (G. B. Sowerby III, 1903) 
 Stomatolina fulgurans (A. Adams, 1850)
 Stomatolina japonica (A. Adams, 1850)
 Stomatolina lirata (A. Adams, 1850) 
 Stomatolina malukana (A. Adams, 1850) 
 Stomatolina sanguinea (A. Adams, 1850)
 Stomatolina speciosa (A. Adams, 1850) 
 Stomatolina tigrina (A. Adams, 1850)

References

 Vaught, K.C. (1989). A classification of the living Mollusca. American Malacologists: Melbourne, FL (USA). . XII, 195 pp.
 Higo, S., Callomon, P. & Goto, Y. (2001) Catalogue and Bibliography of the Marine Shell-Bearing Mollusca of Japan. Gastropoda Bivalvia Polyplacophora Scaphopoda Type Figures. Elle Scientific Publications, Yao, Japan, 208 pp.

 
Trochidae
Gastropod genera